Lough Atorick is a lake in County Clare, Ireland.

See also
List of loughs in Ireland

References

Atorick